The Palestine Technical College is a university technical college in Deir El-Balah, Gaza Strip, Palestine. The college offers bachelor degree programs and 2-year associate degrees in technical education at the post-secondary level, as well as programmers for different target groups through continuing education.

Palestine Technical College (PTC) - Deir El-Balah is a leading governmental college that specializes in technical university education and it was established in 1993. Currently there are more than 1800 student enrolled in the college in 20 diploma programs and 8 B.Sc. programs. The main college campus is located at the city of Deir El-Balah and it serves students from all over the Gaza Strip due to its central location in the strip. Recently, the college has opened a new branch campus in the north of Gaza City to realize its expansion plans. In the academic year 2015/2016, PTC employs around 200 full time employees of which 120 are academic staff and most of them hold either PhD or master degrees. Around 60% of newly enrolled students are females.

References

External links
 Palestine Technical College

Deir al-Balah
Universities and colleges in Gaza Strip
Educational institutions established in 1993
1993 establishments in the Palestinian territories